ODE may refer to:

 Ohio Department of Education, the state education agency of Ohio
 Omicron Delta Epsilon, an international honor society in the field of economics
 Online disinhibition effect, a loosening of social inhibitions during interactions with others on the Internet that would otherwise be present in normal face-to-face interaction 
 Open Dynamics Engine, a real-time physics engine
 Ordinary differential equation, a mathematical concept
 Oregon Daily Emerald, student newspaper of the University of Oregon
 Oxford Dictionary of English, a 1998 English language dictionary
 Apache ODE, a web-services orchestration engine from the Apache Software Foundation

See also
 Ode (disambiguation)
 Odes (disambiguation)